Gökhan Edman (born 11 December 1964) is a Turkish volleyball coach.

Career
As of December 2, 2008, she will be in charge of the Galatasaray Women's A team and youth teams.

References

External links
 Coach profile at WorldofVolley.com 
 Coach profile at Volleybox.net

1964 births
Living people
People from Ankara
Sportspeople from Ankara
Turkish volleyball coaches
Galatasaray S.K. (women's volleyball) coaches
VakıfBank S.K. volleyball coaches
Eczacıbaşı S.K. volleyball coaches